Streptomyces misionensis is a bacterium species from the genus of Streptomyces which has been isolated from soil. Streptomyces misionensis produces misionin.

See also 
 List of Streptomyces species

References

Further reading

External links
Type strain of Streptomyces misionensis at BacDive -  the Bacterial Diversity Metadatabase

misionensis
Bacteria described in 1962